Pillansia is a genus of flowering plants in the family Iridaceae, first described as a genus in 1914. It contains only one known species, Pillansia templemannii, endemic to Cape Province in South Africa.

The genus name is a tribute to the South African botanist Neville Stuart Pillans, who brought the species to the attention of Harriet Margaret Louisa Bolus.

References

Iridaceae
Monotypic Iridaceae genera
Endemic flora of South Africa
Taxa named by John Gilbert Baker
Taxa named by Louisa Bolus